Bulbophyllum ivorense is a species of orchid in the genus Bulbophyllum. They are found in Tropical Moist Forests in the countries touching the Gulf of Guinea in Africa. It was described by Cribb and Perez-Vera.

References

ivorense